Zhao Xiaozhe (born 7 July 1963) is a vice admiral (zhongjiang) of the People's Liberation Army (PLA) and the current director of the Science and Technology Committee of the Central Military Commission.

Biography
Zhao was born in Dalian, Liaoning, on 7 July 1963. He earned a bachelor's degree in 1984, a master's degree in 1987, and a doctor's degree in 1992, all in systems engineering and all from Dalian University of Technology. Beginning in December 1992, he served in several posts in Dalian Naval Academy, including assistant, lecturer, associate professor, professor.

Zhao participated in the People's Liberation Army Navy in February 2005. In June 2018, he became deputy director of the Science and Technology Committee of the Central Military Commission.

He was promoted to the rank of rear admiral (Shaojiang) in August 2009.

Honours and awards 
 1996 State Science and Technology Progress Award (Third Class)
 2004 State Science and Technology Progress Award (Second Class)
 2006 State Science and Technology Progress Award (Second Class)
 2009 State Science and Technology Progress Award (Second Class)
 2011 Member of the Chinese Academy of Engineering (CAE)

References

1963 births
Living people
People from Dalian
Dalian University of Technology alumni
People's Liberation Army generals from Liaoning
Members of the Chinese Academy of Engineering